Drenovci is a village and municipality in the Vukovar-Syrmia County in Croatia. The municipality is part of Slavonia.

Population

According to the 2011 census, there are 5,174 inhabitants, in the following settlements:
 Drenovci, population 1,946
 Đurići, population 286
 Posavski Podgajci, population 1,255
 Račinovci, population 700
 Rajevo Selo, population 987

87.05% of the population are Croats.

Name
The name of the village in Croatian is plural.

See also
Vukovar-Srijem County
Cvelferija

References

Municipalities of Croatia
Populated places in Syrmia
Populated places in Vukovar-Syrmia County